The Illusive Islands are an uninhabited Canadian arctic islands group in Kivalliq Region, Nunavut. They are small, irregularly shaped, and are located mid-channel within Chesterfield Inlet.

References

Islands of Chesterfield Inlet
Uninhabited islands of Kivalliq Region